Stanley Kamel (January 1, 1943 – April 8, 2008) was an American actor, best known for his role as Dr. Charles Kroger on the American television series Monk.

Biography
Kamel was born to a Jewish family and raised in South River, New Jersey. He attended Rutgers Preparatory School. He started his acting career off-Broadway and broke into television with a role in Days of Our Lives as Eric Peters.

Kamel had a recurring role on Melrose Place in 1994 as Bruce Teller, the chief executive officer of D&D Advertising, where Amanda (Heather Locklear) and Allison (Courtney Thorne-Smith) were employed. During the first part of the sixth season of Beverly Hills, 90210, Kamel appeared on several episodes as Anthony Marchette, an organized crime figure.

Kamel was most known for his role as Dr. Charles Kroger in the USA Network television series Monk, playing the infinitely patient and ever-supportive psychiatrist to the main character, Adrian Monk (Tony Shalhoub). Though his last appearance was in the sixth season of Monk, clips of his character were seen later in the series finale.

Death
On April 8, 2008, Kamel was found dead of a heart attack in his Hollywood Hills home. He was 65. "Mr. Monk Buys a House", the premiere episode of the seventh season of Monk, was dedicated to his memory and included a mention of his character (Dr. Kroger) dying of a heart attack.  The final scene of the episode was a close-up of a photo of Kamel, as Dr. Kroger, on Monk's fireplace mantle.

Kamel never married and had no children.

Filmography

Film

Television

References

External links

 
Stanley Kamel at the Internet Broadway Database

 

1943 births
2008 deaths
20th-century American male actors
21st-century American male actors
Male actors from New Jersey
American male film actors
American male stage actors
American male television actors
Jewish American male actors
People from South River, New Jersey
Rutgers Preparatory School alumni
American male soap opera actors
20th-century American Jews
21st-century American Jews